Agha (21 March 1914 – 30 April 1992) was an Indian actor of Bollywood films. He was known for comic roles and modeled himself on Bob Hope's style of acting. He appeared in over 300 Hindi films in his career between 1935 and 1986. His son, Jalal Agha, also became an actor, mostly known for the song Mehbooba Mehbooba in Sholay (1975).

Early life 
Agha Beg was born on 21 March 1914 at Fatima Nagar, Pune, British India. His father was originally from Iran and had settled in Pune but had to leave Pune for Bombay in search of employment
Agha confessed that he went to school for just three days, "that was as long as I could stand it". He spent time "mooching" around the Poona Race Course as he wanted to become a jockey and loved horses. Agha came to Bombay and joined his neighbourhood drama group. His interest in acting took him to films where in 1933 he started as a production manager in Kanwal Movietone.

Career 
Agha's first film was Kanwal Movietone's  Stree Dharma, also called Painted Sin (1935), starring Mehtab and Nazir. However, his films Karwan-e-Husn (1935), Wadia Movietone's Rangila Mazdoor (1938) and Anuradha (1940) helped him gain recognition as a comic actor. He acted in Kikubhai Desai's (Manmohan Desai's father) Circus Ki Sundari (1941), which was popular and this helped in getting lead roles in films such as Muqabala (1942), Laheri Cameraman (1944) and Taxi Driver (1944). His most active years were from the 1930s to the 1980s.

Filmography 
Selected list.

Death 
Agha died on 30 April 1992  of a heart attack in Pune, Maharashtra, India at the age of 78. He was survived by three daughters, one son Jalal Agha and Son-in-law actor Tinnu Anand.

Awards 
He was nominated for the Filmfare Best Supporting Actor Award for the 1960 film Ghunghat, but did not win the award.

References

External links 

20th-century Indian male actors
1914 births
1992 deaths
Male actors in Hindi cinema
Indian male comedians
Film producers from Maharashtra
Male actors from Pune
20th-century comedians